Admiral Sir Anthony Templer Frederick Griffith Griffin  (24 November 1920 – 16 October 1996) was a Royal Navy officer who went on to be Controller of the Navy (1971–1975) and chairman of British Shipbuilders (1977–1980).

Naval career

Early years (1934–1939) 
Griffin joined the Royal Navy in 1934, serving as a cadet at Dartmouth Royal Naval College.

Second World War (1939–1945) 
Griffin began his Second World War service in HMS Gloucester patrolling off Madagascar guarding against German pocket-battleships. The Gloucester then moved to the Mediterranean, where it took part in the first action with the Italian Navy in July 1940 off Calabria. After returning to Britain to attend courses, Griffin sailed for Cape Town aboard SS Britannia when she was sunk by the German commerce raider Thor. Giffin's lifeboat sailed for the Cape Verde Islands, when they were rescued by SS Raranga and taken to Montevideo, Uruguay.

With Fury, Griffin served in the Mediterranean as part of Force H and as an escort to Convoy PQ 17 to the Soviet Union. Returning to the Mediterranean, Griffin sailed as part of Operation Pedestal to supply Malta in August 1942. The following month the ship then once again joined the Arctic Convoys, escorting Convoy PQ 18. Following promotion to lieutenant and being mentioned in dispatches, Griffin was made second-in-command of the new destroyer . With Talybont, Griffin served in the Western Approaches. From there Griffin went to the Far East to serve in the escort carrier . There he was once again mentioned in dispatches.

Postwar service (1945–1971) 
The 1950s saw Griffin promoted to commander in 1951 and captain in 1956. In 1964 he was given command of the aircraft carrier HMS Ark Royal, and in 1966 he took over as Naval Secretary and promoted to rear-admiral. He was made Assistant Chief of the Naval Staff (Warfare) later in 1966, Flag Officer Second in Command Far East Fleet in 1968 and Flag Officer, Plymouth and admiral superintendent at Devonport in 1969.

At one stage he was required to combine his roles of Admiral Superintendent of Plymouth dockyard with his flag officer position, doing one in the morning and another in the afternoon. Of this period he noted, "Sometimes I would write to myself. I was often quite rude to myself, too." He went on to be Controller of the Navy in 1971 before retiring in 1975. Griffin was appointed Knight Commander of the Bath in 1971 followed by the Knight Grand Cross upon his retirement.

Post-naval career 
In retirement he served as chairman of British Shipbuilders from 1977 to 1980. His period in charge of the nationalised shipbuilding company saw the lowest rate of industrial disputes on record. The in coming Conservative Government privatised the company. From there Griffin went on to become chair of the British Maritime League from 1982 to 1987, spent 10 years as vice-chairman of Wellington College and from 1981 to 1984 was president of the Royal Institution of Naval Architects. At the age of 68 he was awarded the Royal Humane Society award for bravery after diving into the River Thames to save a drowning man. The man perished despite Griffin's efforts to save him.

Family
In 1943, he married Rosemary Hickling; they had two sons and one daughter. Lady Griffin died on 2 February 2015. His uncle, Admiral Sir Tom Phillips, was killed when  was sunk in 1941.

References

|-

|-

|-

|-

1920 births
1996 deaths
Royal Navy admirals
Royal Navy officers of World War II
Knights Grand Cross of the Order of the Bath
People educated at Stubbington House School
British people in colonial India
Military personnel of British India